Ree Creek is a stream in the U.S. state of South Dakota. The creek was named after the Ree Indians.

See also
List of rivers of South Dakota

References

Rivers of Hand County, South Dakota
Rivers of South Dakota